Republic, formerly known as the Republican Party is a left-wing political party on the Faroe Islands committed to Faroese independence.

History 

The party was founded in 1948 as a reaction to the islands failing to gain independence despite the outcome of the 1946 independence referendum, after which independence was subsequently declared but annulled by the Danish King.

In 1998, Høgni Hoydal succeeded Heini O. Heinesen as party leader.

During the 20 January 2004 legislative elections, the party won 21.7% of the popular vote and 8 out of 33 seats. However, after the passing of an amendment adding the term "sexual orientation" to paragraph 266b of the Anti-Discrimination Act, MP Karsten Hansen announced that he was leaving the party owing to a difference in opinion. He later joined the Centre Party.

At the elections on 19 January 2008, the party won 23.3% of the vote and  8 out of 33 seats.

On 14 September 2007, the party changed its name from Tjóðveldisflokkurin to simply Tjóðveldi (i.e., from "the Republican Party" to just "Republic").

In the Danish parliamentary elections of 2007, the party received 25.4% of the Faroese vote, thereby retaining one of the two Faroese seats in the Danish national Folketing. In the 2011 election, however, its votes declined and it lost its seat to the Social Democrats. It regained its seat in the 2015 election, then lost it again in the 2019 election.

Leaders

Current members of the Løgting 

As of the 2022 general snap election:

a. Formerly a member of the People's Party until mid-November 2022.

History of Tjóðveldi in the Faroese and Danish general elections

References

External links 

Official site

Ecosocialist parties
Faroese nationalism
Left-wing nationalist parties
Political parties established in 1948
Political parties in the Faroe Islands
Republicanism in Denmark
Republican parties
Separatism in Denmark
Secessionist organizations in Europe
Socialism in the Faroe Islands
Socialist parties in Denmark